Preko (lit. "Across") is a village and a municipality in Zadar County, Croatia. It is situated, as the name suggests, opposite of Zadar, on the island of Ugljan. Its old centre consists of typical Dalmatian architecture with numerous patrician family summer houses. According to the 2011 census, there are 3,805 inhabitants, 88% which are Croats.

Sitting in the mountains above Preko, is the castle of St. Michael, built by Eastern Roman empire in the 6th century. The castle was rebuilt by the Republic of Venice in the 13th century. Its main purpose was control above channel of Zadar and group of islands behind the island of Ugljan.
The castle was sacked by English crusaders on their way to the Holy Land, and by the Nazis in World War II. The high position of the castle made it the perfect lookout and listening station for the occupying Germans. Today, the castle is home to a telecommunications station. About 80 m from Preko lies the islet of Galevac (Školjić).

The 11th century Romanesque church of St. John the Baptist is situated on the eastern side of the locality, near the ferry port. Preko is the closest starting point for the excursion to St. Michael's fortress (265 m above the sea level). The view from the fortress spreads over more than 200 islands of the archipelago of Zadar and Kornati National Park.

Notable natives and residents
Budimir Lončar

References

External links	
	
Municipal website
Island Dugljan
	

 	

	
Municipalities of Croatia	
Populated places in Zadar County	
Ugljan